Matter is the substance of which objects are made.

Matter or Matters may also refer to:

 Matter (philosophy), a concept in philosophy

Entertainment and media
 Matters (album), a 2004 album by Pulley
 Matter (novel), a 2008 novel by Iain M. Banks
Matter (2012 film) an Marathi language Indian film directed by Satish Motling
 Matter (magazine), an online science publication
 Matter (journal), an online science publication
 Matters (band)
 Matter (venue), a London music venue and nightclub
 Matter (album), a 2016 album by synthpop artist St Lucia
 Matter (video game), a cancelled video game for the Xbox 360

Folklore
 Matter of Britain
 Matter of France
 Matter of Rome

Other
 Matter (standard), a home automation connectivity standard
 Matter Valley, a Swiss valley containing Zermatt

See also
 Brain matter (disambiguation)
 Dark matter